Juhani Salovaara (born 4 November 1931) is a Finnish former sailor who competed in the 1964 Summer Olympics. He was born in Helsinki.

References

External links
  

1931 births
Possibly living people
Sportspeople from Helsinki
Finnish male sailors (sport)
Olympic sailors of Finland
Sailors at the 1964 Summer Olympics – 5.5 Metre
20th-century Finnish people